Call for Love is a Chinese romantic comedy film directed by Zhang Jianya. The film premiered in China on February 8, 2007. It stars Xu Zheng, Fan Bingbing, and Eva Huang.

Plot
After being married for seven years, Xu Lang, a white collar office manager, has started to get tired of the same routine in his marriage. After asking his wife for a divorce, he is given a magical cell phone by an angel. The cell phone allows him to have romantic encounters with different women. After various dates and courtships with 12 beautiful women, he still cannot meet the right one. He attempts to mend things over with his wife, only to find that his ex-wife has met another man and found happiness. The movie ends with Xu meeting his old love interest from 15 years ago, suggesting a new relationship between them.

Cast
Xu Zheng as Xu Lang, protagonist
Liu Yiwei as Angel
Jiang Hongbo as boring wife
Song Jia as Girl #1, easy girl
Fan Bingbing as Girl #2, ninja cop
Eva Huang as Girl #3, valley girl
Michelle Bai as Girl #4, girl with intimidating mom
Ning Jing as Girl #5, gold-digger
Annie Yi as Girl #6, career woman with trust issues
Qu Ying as Girl #7, overprotective dog lover
Qin Hailu as Girl #8, feminist freak
Shen Xing as former classmate, Xu Lang's destined romantic partner
Gong Beibi
Che Yongli
Brenda Wang
Huang Jianxiang (cameo)
Chen Luyu (cameo)

References

External links
 
 Official "Call for Love" Site
 Plot Summary
Call for Love at the Chinese Movie Database

2007 romantic comedy films
2007 films
2000s Mandarin-language films
Chinese romantic comedy films
Films directed by Zhang Jianya